Virbia lunulata is a moth in the family Erebidae. It was described by Gottlieb August Wilhelm Herrich-Schäffer in 1855. The type's location is unknown.

References

Moths described in 1855
lunulata